Stephen J. Markman (born June 4, 1949) is a former justice of the Michigan Supreme Court. He was appointed by Republican governor John Engler on October 1, 1999, to fill the vacancy created by the resignation of Justice James H. Brickley.

Education
Markman received his Bachelor of Arts from Duke University in 1971, and he graduated from University of Cincinnati Law School in 1974.

Career
Markman served as Chief Counsel of the United States Senate Subcommittee on the Constitution and as deputy chief counsel of the United States Senate Committee on the Judiciary from 1978 to 1985. He was then nominated to be a United States Assistant Attorney General, heading the Justice Department's Office of Legal Policy, by President Ronald Reagan and confirmed by the Senate. While serving as assistant attorney general, his office wrote a recommendation regarding the issue of possible reconsideration of the Miranda v. Arizona decision by the U.S. Supreme Court. When the Chicago Tribune criticized the recommendation, Markman responded with an opinion piece which the paper published entitled In Defense of Reconsidering Miranda; in this op-ed column, Markman argued for a more flexible interpretation of Miranda to bolster fair treatment of suspects in custody. He wrote:

After being nominated by George H. W. Bush and approved by the United States Senate, Markman served as a United States Attorney in Michigan from 1989 to 1993. He joined the private sector firm of Miller, Canfield, Paddock & Stone in Detroit, where he practiced until he was appointed to the 4th District Michigan Court of Appeals by Governor John Engler in 1995. He held that position until 1999, when Governor Engler appointed him to the Michigan Supreme Court. Michigan voters elected him to the position in 2000.

Since 1993, Markman has taught constitutional law at Hillsdale College, where he holds the title of distinguished visiting professor of Politics.

Markman has contributed to numerous legal publications and was a contributing editor at National Review. He is a Fellow of the Michigan Bar Foundation, a Master of the Bench of the Inns of Court. Markman was sent to Ukraine by the State Department to assist in developing the country's post-Soviet constitution.

Markman was re-elected as Supreme Court judge in 2004 and 2012.

Markman served as chief justice in 2017 and 2018. He did not seek another two years in 2019, and was replaced by Bridget Mary McCormack. Markman's term on the Supreme Court was up for re-election in 2020. However, Markman was ineligible to run due to Michigan's Constitution prohibiting judges that are 70 or older running for office. Markman was 71 in November 2020.

Judicial philosophy
Markman has argued against an increased role by the judiciary in matters of public policy and suggested that unless citizens engage in a constitutional debate, public matters will be increasingly decided by judges. In 2008, Markman wrote a piece for the Harvard Journal of Law and Public Policy saying, "[T]he Michigan Supreme Court has set as its priority the proper exercise of the 'judicial power,' to read the law evenhandedly and give it meaning by assessing its words, its grammar and syntax, its context, and its legislative purpose. The court's dominant premise has been on 'getting the law right'—moving toward the best and most faithful interpretation of the law—rather than reflexively acquiescing in prior case law that essentially reflected little more than the personal preferences of predecessor justices."

In April 2010, Markman published an essay in Hillsdale College's monthly publication, Imprimis, in which he argued against a living constitution with expanded input from judicial governance. Markman prefers an interpretation closer to the 1787 Constitution, and predicts that unless citizens act, justices making under-the-radar decisions on "forgettable and mundane disputes" (as opposed to high–profile decisions such as Roe v. Wade) will steer public policy in directions of their choosing in such areas as "racial quotas, social services funding, and immigration policy." Markman prefers that public policy decisions be made by legislators instead of judges.

Notable Supreme Court decisions

Domestic partner benefits
In Pride at Work v. Governor of Michigan, the Michigan Supreme Court, in a 5–2 ruling, ruled that Michigan's 2004 gay marriage ban also bars same-sex domestic partners of public employees from receiving health insurance benefits. Markman wrote the majority opinion for the court where he said that while "marriages and domestic partnerships aren't identical, they are similar."

Ballot petition signatures
In Michigan Civil Rights Initiative v. Board of State Canvassers, the Michigan Supreme Court ruled that the Michigan Civil Rights Initiative should be placed on the November 2008 ballot, even if some petition signers signed the petition under the belief that it was in support of affirmative action. In his opinion, Markman wrote, "The signers of these petitions did not sign the oral representations made to them by circulators; rather they signed written petitions that contained the actual language of the MCRI. ... In carrying out the responsibilities of self-government, 'we the people' of Michigan are responsible for our own actions. In particular, when the citizen acts in what is essentially a legislative capacity by facilitating the enactment of a constitutional amendment, he cannot blame others when he signs a petition without knowing what it says. It is not to excuse misrepresentations, when they occur, to recognize nonetheless that it is the citizen's duty to inform himself about the substance of a petition before signing it, precisely in order to combat potential misrepresentations."

Emergency powers of the Michigan executive
In re Certified Questions (Midwest Institute Of Health, PLLC v Governor), contrary to his prior advocacy of judicial restraint, Markman ruled for a fragmented court that Michigan's Emergency Management Act of 1976 (EMA) and the Emergency Powers of the Governor Act of 1945 (EPGA) were an "unlawful delegation of legislative power to the executive branch in violation of the Michigan Constitution." The decision was "handed down by a narrow majority of Republican justices."
Michigan became an outlier. At this time, every state and the Federal government had declared an emergency due to the CoViD-19 pandemic.

Michigan's lower courts had previously ruled against the Republican-controlled legislature.
This decision was an advisory opinion via a Federal lawsuit by outpatient medical providers over an order by Democratic Governor Gretchen Whitmer that barred nonessential medical procedures during the pandemic.

Personal life
Markman lives in Mason, Michigan with his wife, Mary Kathleen, and their sons Charles and James.

See also
List of justices of the Michigan Supreme Court

References

External links
 Markman for Justice official campaign site
 Profile at the Michigan Supreme Court
 

|-

1949 births
20th-century American judges
21st-century American judges
Chief Justices of the Michigan Supreme Court
Duke University alumni
Hillsdale College faculty
Jewish American attorneys
Living people
Michigan Court of Appeals judges
Michigan Republicans
Justices of the Michigan Supreme Court
Lawyers from Detroit
People from Mason, Michigan
Reagan administration personnel
United States Attorneys for the Eastern District of Michigan
University of Cincinnati alumni